Domulgeni is a village in Florești District, Moldova.

References

External links
HDR Photos of Domulgeni Village, June 2011

Villages of Florești District